Thomas Cadell (1835–1919) was a Scottish soldier and recipient of the Victoria Cross.

Thomas Cadell may also refer to:

Thomas Cadell (politician) (1831–1896) 
 Thomas Cadell (publisher) (1742–1802) 
 Thomas Cadell the younger (1773–1836), bookseller with Cadell & Davies